Vekoma Rides Manufacturing is a Dutch amusement ride manufacturer. Vekoma is syllabic abbreviation of Veld Koning Machinefabriek (Veld Koning Machine Factory) which was established in 1926 by Hendrik op het Veld.

History
The company originally manufactured farm equipment and later made steel constructions for the coal mining industry in the 1950s. As business shifted from farming equipment to steel construction, Veld Koning Machinefabriek was shortened to Vekoma. After the closure of Dutch mines in 1965, Vekoma manufactured steel pipes for the petrochemical industry. In the 1970s Vekoma was contracted by U.S. amusement ride manufacturer Arrow Development to build the steel structure for its roller coasters in Europe. As demand increased, Arrow instructed Vekoma in track building techniques and eventually licensed its coaster-building technology. In 1979 Vekoma entered the market on its own, opening three coasters in Europe under the name Vekoma Rides Manufacturing BV.

On August 23, 2001, Vekoma filed for bankruptcy.

In 2006, Vekoma formed an alliance with U.S.-based manufacturer Chance Morgan. Chance Rides represented Vekoma in North America and Chance Morgan manufactured the steel track for select projects. During this agreement, Chance built four Vekoma-designed family coasters.

In 2008, Vekoma Rides Manufacturing acquired the Wheels of Excellence range of Ferris wheels from Ronald Bussink. Under the agreement, Bussink will continue to supply wheels 100 meters and taller. Smaller wheels in the 40- to 80-meter range will be manufactured by a new division of Vekoma, Dutch Wheels BV.

On October 17, 2012, Chance Rides and Vekoma discontinued the agreement to produce rides together for the North American market. However, shortly after terminating that agreement, Chance Rides was given an exclusive license from Dutch Wheels BV to manufacture and sell R60 wheels in the North American market under a new affiliate, Chance American Wheels.

On March 30, 2018, Vekoma was acquired by Sansei Technologies, the parent company of American ride manufacturer S&S Sansei. The conditions stipulated that Vekoma's business model remain unchanged after the acquisition. Vekoma continues to manufacture and market rides as a separate entity.

Roller coasters

, there are over 387 roller coasters around the world from Vekoma, some of which are either under construction or have been removed.

Models

Other Vekoma coaster models include Wild Mouse, Hyper Space Warp, Firestorm, Swinging Turns, Enigma, Illusion, Family Boomerang, Tilt Coaster, Energy Storm and Powered Coasters.

In 2013, Vekoma signed a deal with Idaho-based Rocky Mountain Construction. The agreement allows Vekoma to sell Rocky Mountain Construction's roller coasters outside the North American market.

Vekoma is also the constructor of Guardians of the Galaxy: Cosmic Rewind at EPCOT in Walt Disney World, designing innovative new "omni-coaster" cars with the capability for controlled turns and spins.  Opening in 2022, this is one of the longest and most ambitious indoor coasters ever constructed.

Other attractions

Ferris wheels
The Dutch Wheels product range includes the R40, R50, and R60 models, each available in three different types.

Notable installations

Madhouse

A madhouse is a flat ride that gives the impression that the rider is upside-down, when in reality the room they are in rotates around them.

Gallery

References

External links 

 
 

 
Roller coaster manufacturers
Multinational companies headquartered in the Netherlands
Design companies established in 1926
Manufacturing companies established in 1926
1926 establishments in the Netherlands
Amusement ride manufacturers
Companies that filed for Chapter 11 bankruptcy in 2001